Anomioptera is a genus of flies belonging to the family Lesser Dung flies.

Species
A. bialba Marshall, 1998
A. picta Schiner, 1868
A. plaumanni Deeming, 1966
A. quadrialba Marshall, 1998
A. quinquealba Marshall, 1998
A. tresalba Marshall, 1998

References

Sphaeroceridae
Diptera of South America
Brachycera genera